The Bledisloe Cup is an annual rugby union competition originally staged between the national teams of Australia's Wallabies and New Zealand's All Blacks that has been contested since the 1930s. The frequency that the competition is held has varied, as has the number of matches played in each tournament, but it currently consists of an annual three-match series, reduced to a two-match series in World Cup years, with two of the matches counting towards The Rugby Championship. New Zealand have had the most success, winning the trophy in 2022 for the 50th time (excluding the disputed inaugural competition in 1931), while Australia have won the trophy 12 times.

History 

Semantics plays a role in the issue when was the inaugural  Bledisloe Cup match played. The Australian Rugby Union (ARU) contend that the one-off 1931 match played at Eden Park was first. The only record of a match taking place is recorded in the minutes of a New Zealand union management meeting several days later that Lord Bledisloe wished to present a cup for the All Blacks and Wallabies competition. The New Zealand Rugby Union (NZRU) believe that the first match was when New Zealand toured Australia in 1932.

Between 1931 and 1981, the Bledisloe Cup was contested irregularly in the course of rugby tours between the two countries, with New Zealand winning it nineteen times and Australia four times. In 1949, Australia won the competition for the first time on New Zealand soil. The trophy itself was apparently 'lost' during this period and reportedly rediscovered in a Melbourne store room. It was contested annually from 1982 to 1995, sometimes as a series of three matches (two in 1995) and other times in a single match. During these years, New Zealand won the trophy eleven times and Australia three times.

Since 1996, the cup has been contested as part of the annual Tri Nations tournament. Until 1998, the cup was contested in a three-match series consisting of the two Tri Nations matches between the two sides and a third match. New Zealand won the series in 1996 and 1997, and Australia won it in 1998.

In 1996, and from 1999 through 2005, the third match was not played; during these years, Australia and New Zealand played each other twice as part of the Tri Nations for the cup. If the two teams won one game each, or if both games were drawn, the cup was retained by its current holder. The non-holder needed to win the two games 2–0 or 1–0 (with a draw) to regain the cup. A criticism of this system was that, with the two sides being very well matched in ability level, it was very common for the teams to win one game each and many rugby fans were dissatisfied with one team keeping the cup in the years when the series was tied at 1–1 (1999, 2000, 2002, 2004).

In 2006, the Tri Nations series was extended so that each team played each other three times, meaning a return of the three-game contest for the Bledisloe Cup. However, the cup reverted to the two-game contest in 2007 because the Tri Nations was abbreviated that year to minimise interference with the teams' preparations for the World Cup.

The three-match format for the Bledisloe Cup continued in 2012, with the first two matches taking place as part of the 2012 Rugby Championship.

Neutral venues

Hong Kong
In 2008 the Bledisloe Cup was contested over an unprecedented four matches, with three games each played in Australia and New Zealand, followed by a fourth (and potentially deciding) game in Hong Kong, in an effort to promote the game in Asia. This was the first time Australia and New Zealand had played in a third country outside the Rugby World Cup. The Hong Kong match drew a crowd of 39,000 to see the All Blacks defeat the Wallabies 19–14 (despite New Zealand having already won the Bledisloe Cup for 2008), generating a reported £5.5 million and proving to be a financial success for the two unions. A fourth match was again set in Hong Kong in 2010, but failed to attract sufficient ticket sales.

Japan
The capital Tokyo hosted a fourth Bledisloe Test match on 31 October 2009. Each team expected to clear at least A$3.8 million/NZ$5 million from the Tokyo match.

On 27 October 2018, Bledisloe Cup returned to Japan for the second time and was hosted in Yokohama with the purpose of promoting and preparing for 2019 Rugby World Cup. All Blacks beating Wallabies 37–20 in the third test to sweep the series. The attendance figures was around 46,000 which became the record for a rugby test match in Japan. The relatively poor ticket sales included about 10% arrived via giveaways because of clashing with the fixture between Japan and World XV a day before in Osaka and lack of competitiveness of Wallabies contributing to dead rubber match of the series.

United States
Before the first match in Hong Kong, the two countries' rugby federations were considering taking Cup matches to the United States and Japan in 2009 and 2010. However, the proposed match in the United States did not come to fruition.

Future proposals
Behind the push from World Rugby with their League of Nations concept, only one match result would count for League of Nations points but the new season schedule must be able to accommodate a second Test each year in the new format. The gate receipts from Bledisloe Cup match ups are critical to both Rugby Australia and New Zealand Rugby Union and both nations are firm in their belief that one home match is mandatory. The third Bledisloe, which has long been a cash cow for both nations, could cease to exist. Any cash lost from forfeiting that match would be compensated by A$18 million per year in League of Nations broadcast revenue.

Results

Matches and statistics

Match stats
As of 24 September 2022

Venues
As of 24 September 2022

In Australia

In New Zealand

Media coverage
In Australia, the Bledisloe Cup was televised between 1992 and 1995 by Network Ten. Since 1996, paid service Fox Sports has televised it jointly with (free to air) Seven Network between 1996 and 2010, Nine Network (2011–2012), Network Ten (2013–2020) and since 2021 the Nine Network has held full broadcast rights alongside its paid streaming arm Stan Sport.

See also

History of rugby union matches between Australia and New Zealand
Laurie O'Reilly Cup
Rugby union trophies and awards

Notes

References

History of rugby union matches between Australia and New Zealand
International rugby union competitions hosted by Australia
International rugby union competitions hosted by New Zealand
1931 establishments in Australia
1931 establishments in New Zealand
The Rugby Championship trophies
Recurring sporting events established in 1931